The Fifth Sea Lord was formerly one of the Naval Lords and members of the Board of Admiralty that controlled the Royal Navy.  The post's incumbent had responsibility for naval aviation.

History
In 1805, for the first time, specific functions were assigned to each of the 'Naval' Lords, who were described as 'Professional' Lords, leaving to the 'Civil' Lords the routine business of signing documents.

During World War I it was one of four additional Sea Lords created during the war to manage the Navy.  The only officer to hold the title during World War I was Commodore Godfrey Paine. Commodore Paine simultaneously held the title of Director of Naval Aviation. After the Air Force Bill received the Royal Assent in November 1917, the Air Council was created on 3 January 1918 which included Paine.

The post of Fifth Sea Lord then lapsed until 1938 when the Admiralty regained responsibility for naval aviation: the post was reestablished and was the Chief of Naval Air Services, responsible for preparation and management of all of the Royal Navy's aircraft and air personnel.

From 1957 to 1965 the Fifth Sea Lord's post was held jointly with the Deputy Chief of the Naval Staff. The post was abolished in 1965.

In the 21st century the Assistant Chief of the Naval Staff (Aviation, Amphibious Capability & Carriers) has a similar role.

List of Fifth Sea Lords

Fifth Sea Lords and Chief of Naval Air Service 1917–1918
Included:
Rear Admiral Sir Godfrey Paine 1917
Note: with the transfer of naval aviation to the Royal Air Force in 1918, the appointment lapsed and was not revived until 1938

Fifth Sea Lords 1938-1956
Admiral The Hon. Sir Alexander Ramsay 1938–1939
Vice Admiral Sir Guy Royle 1939–1941
Rear Admiral Sir Lumley Lyster 1941–1942
Note: the title was in abeyance from 1942 to 1943 although Admiral Sir Frederic Dreyer was Chief of Naval Air Services
Vice Admiral Sir Denis Boyd 1943–1945
Rear Admiral Sir Thomas Troubridge 1945–1946
Admiral Sir Philip Vian 1946–1948
Vice Admiral Sir George Creasy 1948–1949
Vice Admiral Sir Maurice Mansergh 1949–1951
Vice Admiral Sir Edmund Anstice 1951–1954
Vice Admiral Sir Alexander Bingley 1954–1956

Fifth Sea Lords and Deputy Chiefs of the Naval Staff 1957–1965
Vice Admiral Sir Manley Power 1957–1959
Admiral Sir Laurence Durlacher 1959–1962
Vice Admiral Sir Peter Gretton 1962–1963
Vice Admiral Sir Frank Hopkins 1963–1965

Admiralty departments and divisions under the fifth sea lord
As of 1917
Air Department
Air Division

As of 1939
Air Branch
Air Materiel Department
Department of the Director Aircraft Maintenance & Repair
Department of Air Personnel

As of 1941 

Air Branch
Naval Air Division (co-responsibility with the Naval Staff)
Department of the Director Airfield & Carrier Requirements
Department of the Director of Air Equipment
Department of the Director Aircraft Maintenance & Repair

As of 1957
Fleet Air Arm
Naval Air Warfare Division (co-responsibility with the Naval Staff)
Naval Air Organisation and Training Division (co-responsibility with the Naval Staff)
Department of the Director of Air Equipment and Naval Photography
Department of the Director Aircraft Maintenance & Repair
Department of the Director Naval Aircraft Development and Production
Office of the Adviser on Aircraft Accidents

As of 1962
Fleet Air Arm

In fiction
In the title story of his 1960 short story collection For Your Eyes Only, Ian Fleming wrote that M, James Bond's MI6 superior, gave up a likely appointment as Fifth Sea Lord in order to head the spy agency.

See also
 First Sea Lord
 Second Sea Lord
 Third Sea Lord
 Fourth Sea Lord

References

Sources
 Naval Staff, Training and Staff Duties Division (1929). The Naval Staff of the Admiralty. Its Work and Development. B.R. 1845 (late C.B. 3013). Copy at The National Archives. ADM 234/434.

 

Royal Navy

Royal Navy appointments
Admiralty during World War II